Ben Gabriel (25 February 1918 – 25 April 2012) was an Australian actor, director, voice artist and theatre founder. Gabriel had numerous appearances in stage and radio roles and in film and television.

Biography
He was born as James Vernon Gabriel in England. His mother was Ethel Florence McConnell, (31 October 1888 – 23 May 1967, (aged 78) born in Kent, England came to Australia 1919, died Sydney) and known professionally as Ethel Gabriel was an actress with the Elizabethan Theatre Trust, featuring in such productions as Ray Lawler's Summer of the Seventeenth Doll.

Gabriel grew up in Sydney and Wollongong and saw war service as a lance-sergeant for six years with the 9th division during World War II. He officially changed his stage name to Ben Gabriel, a name he had always used on a personal basis.

His career began in theatre in the late 1930s and television career spanned from the early 1960s until the late 80s. One of his early roles was as the alien leader, the Soshun, in the ABC science fiction series The Stranger. Gabriel appeared in numerous early productions of Homicide, Matlock Police and Division 4, all part of the Crawford Productions banner, characters role would be a plenty in soap opera from Sons and Daughters, Prisoner, Home and Away, All Saints, and Skippy the Bush Kangaroo. His film repertoire extended with roles in such gems us The Office Picnic, The Mango Tree, Breaking Day and Fighting Back. However, he would come to greater prominence as Jim Shirley in Contrabandits, picking up the Penguin Award for Best Supporting Actor.

Having toured the stage with his mum in 1959 and 1960 seasons of the Doll, Gabriel continued his acting career in theatre at the Sydney Theatre Company with roles in productions that included Three Sisters and The Lower Depths, and at the Ensemble theatre as a holocaust survivor in A Shaya Maidel.

Personal life and legacy 
In 1949, he married opera singer Rhonney Webber. Together they had one daughter but soon divorced less than ten years later. He later married actress and director Doreen Warburton (OBE), who was also born in London, England, but had emigrated to Australia in 1953 and awarded the OBE in 1972. His wife and his daughter, Laura, both survived him after his death on 25 April 2012.

Australian actor Noel Hodda, during his eulogy, described Ben Gabriel as "an old school actor – there to serve the writer, the story and the director and by doing that, serving the audience."

References 

1918 births
2012 deaths
Australian male film actors
Australian television actors
Australian male stage actors
Australian Army personnel of World War II
English emigrants to Australia
Australian Army soldiers